The Assistant Secretary of State for Intelligence and Research is the head of the Bureau of Intelligence and Research (INR) within the United States Department of State.  Before 1986, the head of INR was the Director of the Bureau of Intelligence and Research.  The Assistant Secretary of State for Intelligence and Research reports to the United States Deputy Secretary of State. Since September 2021,  Brett M. Holmgren has served as the Assistant Secretary of State for INR.

Assistant Secretaries of State for Intelligence and Research, 1986–present

The office of "Director of the Bureau of Intelligence and Research" was renamed "Assistant Secretary of State for Intelligence and Research" on August 18, 1986.

List of directors of the Bureau of Intelligence and Research, 1957–1986

References

External links
List of Assistant Secretaries of State for Intelligence and Research by the State Department Historian
Bureau of Intelligence and Research Website